This is the Cabinet of Uttarakhand headed by the Chief Minister of Uttarakhand, Bhagat Singh Koshyari from 2001–2002.

Council of Ministers
Here is the list of cabinet ministers.

 Cabinet Ministers:
 Ramesh Pokhriyal - Finance, Rural Development, Medical Education, Planning, Revenue, Drinking Water, Trade Tax
 Kedar Singh Phonia
 Matbar Singh Kandari - Forest
 Ajay Bhatt
 Harbans Kapoor - Urban Development, Housing, Labour & Employment
 Mohan Singh Rawat
 Narayan Ram Das

References

Uttarakhand ministries
2001 establishments in Uttarakhand
Cabinets established in 2001
Cabinets disestablished in 2002
2002 disestablishments in India